Jana Chen, born January 27, 1989, is a Chinese C-pop (Mandopop) singer who started her career in 2010.

Biography

Personal life 
Chen Juan Er was born in Meizhou, (Guangdong province) in a middle-class family. She started showing interest in music when she was a child. Following her artistic interest some years later, she emigrated to Guangzhou and entered the Xinghai Conservatory of Music, where she started developing her singing skills. After finishing the course inside that institution, she successfully graduated as a Pop singer.

Music career 
Soon after her graduation, the young singer started attracting the interest of some publishers. In 2010 she signed a contract with the Beijing-based record label; Dongjia Entertainment, in which she would release her first album entitled "The more lonely I am, the more I sing", an album characterized by a Teen pop and R&B sound combined with some Rock and mainstream pop songs. This album featured her first hit song, "All your wrong" which she sang as a duo with Liù zhé, a male singer who was also signed to the same company. The music video for this track accumulates 7 million views in YouTube.

One year after her debut, Jana released "You have just found me all alone" her second album in which she started moving away from her initial teen-pop style to a more mature pop-rock one. This time, Chen started taking part in TV programs and variety shows where she performed her songs.

In November 2011 she released a compilation album entitled "Listen to me singing a song" which contained her most famous songs till then and three new songs.

In 2012, Chen's career continued its rise. She took part in "Marvelous blue sky," a Zhejiang TV program, she started a solo tour and she also took part in the short film "Turn it into love" in which she had a short role.

In March 2013, the singer released her third studio album "Provocation" after two years out of the recording studios. This album not only follows the trend of her previous studio albums towards pop-rock music, but also developed a more sensual and sentimental style with songs talking mostly about sadness and sorrow.

In 2016, Jana, after another two-year hiatus, left her record label and signed a contract with the Guangzhou-based label; Shì zhōng shēng Media. After that, she increased her musical activity and released many single releases, music videos, a new studio album entitled "Coldness" and two EPs.

Discography

Studio albums 
 The more lonely I am, the more I sing (2010)
 You have just found me all alone (2011)
 Provocation (2013)
 Coldness (2016)
 Rebirth (2017)

Compilation albums 
 Listen to me singing a song (2011)

EPs 
 Between you and me (April 20, 2016)
 Nothing is bad ( October 27, 2016)

Singles 
 You never thought (August 8, 2016)
 Shadowy identity (September 5, 2016)
 You don't love me (September 24, 2016)
 Nothing is perfect (October 14, 2016)
 I'm busy (October 27, 2016)

References

External links 
 Jana Chen official Weibo
 Jana Chen's QQ music profile

1989 births
Chinese Mandopop singers
Hakka musicians
Living people
Mandopop singer-songwriters
Musicians from Meizhou
Singers from Guangdong
21st-century Chinese women singers